Władysław Pabisz (5 January 1931 — 11 March 2007), was a Polish ice hockey goaltender. He played for KTH Krynica and Podhale Nowy Targ during his career. He also played for the Polish national team at the 1956 and 1964 Winter Olympics and several World Championships.

He won the Poland Silver Medal three times during his career; with KTH Krynica in the 1952 - 1953 season, at Podhale Nowy Targ during the 1962 - 1963 season, and again at Podhale Nowy Targ the following season, 1963 - 1964.

References

External links

1931 births
2007 deaths
Ice hockey players at the 1956 Winter Olympics
Ice hockey players at the 1964 Winter Olympics
KTH Krynica players
Olympic ice hockey players of Poland
Podhale Nowy Targ players
Polish ice hockey goaltenders
Sportspeople from Nowy Sącz